The 2020 Draft Top 250 was a NASCAR Xfinity Series race held on October 31, 2020. It was contested over 250 laps on the  oval. It was the thirty-second race of the 2020 NASCAR Xfinity Series season, the sixth race of the playoffs, and the final race in the Round of 8. Joe Gibbs Racing driver Harrison Burton collected his fourth win of the season.

Report

Background 
Martinsville Speedway is an NASCAR-owned stock car racing track located in Henry County, in Ridgeway, Virginia, just to the south of Martinsville. At  in length, it is the shortest track in the NASCAR Xfinity Series. The track was also one of the first paved oval tracks in NASCAR, being built in 1947 by H. Clay Earles. It is also the only remaining race track that has been on the NASCAR circuit from its beginning in 1948.

Entry list 

 (R) denotes rookie driver.
 (i) denotes driver who is ineligible for series driver points.

Qualifying 
Austin Cindric was awarded the pole based on competition based formula.

Qualifying results

Race

Race results

Stage Results 
Stage One
Laps: 70

Stage Two
Laps: 70

Final Stage Results 

Laps: 110

Race statistics 

 Lead changes: 11 among 6 different drivers
 Cautions/Laps: 10 for 63
 Time of race: 2 hours, 7 minutes, and 56 seconds
 Average speed:

References 

NASCAR races at Martinsville Speedway
2020 in sports in Virginia
Draft Top 250
2020 NASCAR Xfinity Series